Three Way Peak is a  summit located on the eastern border of Mount Rainier National Park. It is also on the shared border of Pierce County and Yakima County in Washington state. Three Way Peak is situated 0.42 mi (0.68 km) north of Cupalo Rock on the crest of the Cascade Range. Its nearest higher peak is Crystal Mountain,  to the northwest. Chinook Peak is 0.8 mile to the southwest. Precipitation runoff from Three Way Peak drains into tributaries of the White River and Naches River.

Climate
Three Way Peak is located in the marine west coast climate zone of western North America. Most weather fronts originate in the Pacific Ocean, and travel northeast toward the Cascade Mountains. As fronts approach, they are forced upward by the peaks of the Cascade Range (Orographic lift), causing them to drop their moisture in the form of rain or snowfall onto the Cascades. As a result, the west side of the Cascades experiences high precipitation, especially during the winter months in the form of snowfall. During winter months, weather is usually cloudy, but, due to high pressure systems over the Pacific Ocean that intensify during summer months, there is often little or no cloud cover during the summer. Because of maritime influence, snow tends to be wet and heavy, resulting in high avalanche danger.

See also

 Geology of the Pacific Northwest

Gallery

References

External links
 National Park Service: Mount Rainier National Park

Cascade Range
Mountains of Pierce County, Washington
Mountains of Washington (state)
Mountains of Yakima County, Washington
North American 2000 m summits